is a passenger railway station located in  Kanagawa-ku, Yokohama, Kanagawa Prefecture, Japan, operated by the private railway company Keikyū.

Lines
Kanagawa-shimmachi Station is served by the Keikyū Main Line and is located 20.0 kilometers from the terminus of the line at Shinagawa  Station in Tokyo.

Station layout
The station consists of two elevated island platforms serving four tracks, with the station building underneath.

Platforms

History
It assumed its present name in April, 1927. In March 1978, the platforms were lengthened to handle 12-car long trains.

On September 5, 2019 at approximately 11:40, a Keikyu express train in the direction of Yokohama crashed into a truck on the railway crossing just beyond the platform of the Kanagawa-shimmachi station. The express train derailed, leaving 1 person (the truck driver) dead and 30 people injured.

Keikyū introduced station numbering to its stations on 21 October 2010; Kanagawa-shimmachi was assigned station number KK34.

Passenger statistics
In fiscal 2019, the station was used by an average of 19,584 passengers daily. 

The passenger figures for previous years are as shown below.

Surrounding area
 Shinmachi Keikyu training center
Kanagawa Shirahata Post Office

See also
 List of railway stations in Japan

References

External links

 

Railway stations in Kanagawa Prefecture
Railway stations in Japan opened in 1915
Keikyū Main Line
Railway stations in Yokohama